Cloverdale is an unincorporated community in Mobile County, Alabama, United States, located  west-northwest of Grand Bay.

References

Unincorporated communities in Mobile County, Alabama
Unincorporated communities in Alabama